Nicolaas van Buren (1578–1619), Latinized Nicolaus Burenus, was a Dutch Jesuit and a translator of controversial and devotional writings. Born in Arnhem, he became a Jesuit in 1596, and died in the Spanish Netherlands on 18 October 1619.

Authors that he translated include Martin Becanus, Francisco Arias, Robert Bellarmine, Luca Pinelli and Fulvio Androzzi.

Translations
 Francisco Arias, Het goedt ghebruyck van de twee H. Sacramenten der Biechten ende des Autaers (Antwerp, Joachim Trognaesius, 1603; 2nd edition 1607)
 Robert Bellarmine, Opclimminghe des gheests tot Godt door de leeder der creatueren (Antwerp, Willem Lesteens, 1617)
 Fulvio Androzzi, Onderwys oft practycke om dikwils het H. Sacrament des Autaers profytelyck te nutten (Antwerp, Willem Lesteens, 1618)
 Martin Becanus, Verschillen oft verscheijden titels der Calvinisten (Antwerp, Willem Lesteens, 1618)
 Francisco Arias, Van de tegenwoordigheid Gods (Antwerp, Willem Lesteens, 1619)
 Luca Pinelli, De cracht ende Misterie der H. Misse (Antwerp, Willem Lesteens, 1620)

References

People from Arnhem
1578 births
1619 deaths
16th-century Dutch Jesuits
Latin–Dutch translators
17th-century Dutch Jesuits